Sumburgh is a small settlement in the Shetland Islands, Scotland. Sumburgh is located at the south end of the Mainland on Sumburgh Head. Sumburgh Airport is just outside the village to the north. Sumburgh has a population of approximately 100. Jarlshof is situated to the west of Sumburgh, adjacent to Sumburgh Hotel. Sumburgh is within the parish of Dunrossness.

References

External links

Undiscovered Scotland - Sumburgh

Villages in Mainland, Shetland